Eagle Ridge Country Estates is an organized hamlet in the Rural Municipality of Corman Park No. 344 near the city of Saskatoon, Saskatchewan, Canada.  The hamlet consists of 26 estates.

References

Corman Park No. 344, Saskatchewan
Organized hamlets in Saskatchewan
Division No. 11, Saskatchewan